Quyang is an urban town and the county seat of Jingzhou Miao and Dong Autonomous County in Hunan, China. The town is located in the south central region of the county. Its seat of local government is at Tuqiaojie Community. The town is bordered to the north by Taiyangping Township, to the northwest by Aoshang Town, to the northeast by Wenxi Township, to the south by Xinchang Town, to the southwest by Outuan Township, and to the west by Sanqiao Township.

History
It was reformed to merge Pukpou Township, Hengjiangqiao Township and the former Quyang Town on November 25, 2015.

Administrative division
As of 2015, the town is divided into 8 communities and 61 villages.

Geography
There are a number of popular mountains located immediately adjacent to the townsite which include Mount Qingdian; Mount Fei; Mount Fengmu; Mount Wubaijiao; Mount Dalaogu and Mount Mayipo.

There are 27 reservoirs in the town, such as Shuiniangtang Reservoir, Ma'andong Reservoir, Jinmai Reservoir, and Feishan Reservoir.

There are two major rivers flow through the town, namely Diling River and Qushui River.

Economy
The local economy is primarily based upon agriculture, mineral resources and local industry. The region abounds with manganese and alum.

Transport
The National Highway G209 and G65 Baotou–Maoming Expressway pass across the town south to north.

The Provincial Highway S222 passes across the town west to east.

The Provincial Highway S221 terminates at the town.

The Jiaozuo–Liuzhou railway passes across the town north to south.

References

Jingzhou Miao and Dong Autonomous County
County seats in Hunan